Kevin Riley may refer to:
Kevin Riley (born 1987), former American football quarterback for California
Kevin Riley (politician), member of the New York City Council
Kevin Buchanan (born Kevin Riley), a One Life to Live character
Kevin Riley (Star Trek), a Star Trek character

See also
Kevin Reilly (disambiguation)